The RIT Tigers represented the Rochester Institute of Technology in College Hockey America during the 2014-15 NCAA Division I women's ice hockey season. In their third year at the Division I level, the Tigers repeated as CHA Tournament champions and secured their first berth in the NCAA tournament.

Offseason
August 8: It was announced by the NCAA that the RIT Tigers have passed their two-year probation and have qualified to become a full-fledged member of NCAA Division I hockey as of the 2014-15 campaign. Of note, the Tigers are now eligible to qualify for the NCAA Tournament and gain the opportunity to bid for hosting rights for future NCAA Tournaments.

Standings

Recruiting

Transfer

News and notes
March 7: Double overtime was required in order for RIT to claim their second consecutive CHA Tournament title. A 2-1 win against Syracuse resulted in the longest contest in Syracuse history. The first goal of the game was scored by Syracuse in the second period. Lindsay Grigg tied the game in the third, with assists being credited to Caitlin Wallace and Taylor Thurston. Carly Payerl logged the overtime-winning tally against Syracuse backstop Jenn Gilligan in double overtime.

Roster

2014–15 Tigers

Schedule

|-
!colspan=12 style=""| Regular Season

|-
!colspan=12 style=""| CHA Tournament

|-
!colspan=12 style=""| NCAA Tournament

Awards and honors
 Lindsay Grigg CHA Best Defensive Forward
Taylor Thurston CHA Individual Sportsmanship
Christa Vuglar  CHA All- Rookie Team

References

RIT
RIT Tigers women's ice hockey seasons
Sports in Rochester, New York